Cliché Hot is the first studio album by Canadian hip hop group Radio Radio. The album was nominated for the Félix Award for best hip hop album and the band was nominated for revelation of the year. The album was also the basis of Radio Radio's nomination for a Prix Éloizes in 2010.

The song "Jacuzzi" was particularly popular in Quebec and the video was also nominated for a Félix Award in 2009. It is included in the ice hockey video game NHL 2K11.

Track listing

References

2008 debut albums
Radio Radio (band) albums